Alessandro Diamanti (born 2 May 1983) is an Italian professional footballer who plays as a midfielder for A-League club Western United. At club level, he has previously played for Prato, Empoli, Fucecchio, Fiorentina, AlbinoLeffe, West Ham United, Brescia, Bologna, Guangzhou Evergrande, Watford, Atalanta, Palermo, Perugia and Livorno.

At international level, he represented Italy at UEFA Euro 2012, winning a runners-up medal, and at the 2013 FIFA Confederations Cup, winning a bronze medal.

Club career

Prato
Diamanti spent his early career with Prato, Empoli, Florentia and AlbinoLeffe.

Livorno
Having scored 15 goals in 31 outings during the 2006–07 season, Diamanti signed for Serie A side Livorno. He made 14 starts and 12 substitute appearances in his first season with the Tuscany side. He stayed with Livorno when they were relegated to Serie B due to finishing last in the 2007–08 Serie A.

On 23 August 2009, Diamanti played in Livorno's opening day fixture in Serie A, a 0–0 home draw against Cagliari.

West Ham United
The following week, however, Diamanti signed a five-year deal with Premier League club West Ham United for an undisclosed fee. He made his debut in the Hammers 1–0 defeat away to Wigan Athletic on 12 September. In the process, Diamanti became the 800th player in West Ham United's history. He scored his first West Ham goal from the penalty spot, albeit controversially as he fell over on run up and kicked the ball with both feet, on his home debut against Liverpool on 19 September 2009. Diamanti scored eight goals, though only three came from open play with most coming from penalty kicks. On 4 May 2010, he was voted runner-up as Hammer of the Year by the club's supporters, for the 2009–10 season, behind winner Scott Parker.

Brescia
On 24 August 2010, Serie A club Brescia bought Diamanti for €2.2 million from West Ham with an additional €300,000 to be paid if Brescia secured their Serie A status for the coming campaign. Brescia also announced in its financial report that Diamanti had cost the club €3.85 million.

Alessandro was unveiled at Brescia on 25 August 2010 and chose to continue wearing the number 32 shirt. Due to his popularity, ability and playing style, comparisons were drawn between Diamanti and former club icon Roberto Baggio, which Diamanti played down, however. In his debut season at Brescia, Diamanti scored six Serie A goals, behind only Andrea Caracciolo as the club's top scorer for the domestic season. Diamanti's sixth goal came in a 2–1 loss against Catania which confirmed Brescia's relegation to Serie B, just one season after promotion to the top-flight.

In July 2011, West Ham called for Diamanti's registration at Brescia to be suspended by the Italian Football Federation (FIGC) claiming the latest instalment of his €2.2 million transfer fee from Brescia had not yet been paid.

Bologna
On 1 August 2011, Diamanti was signed by Serie A side Bologna in a co-ownership deal with Brescia, for €1.5 million. (Italian) Diamanti's first goal for the club came in a 3–1 home defeat to Internazionale on 24 September. On 11 December, Bologna played host to Inter's cross–city rivals Milan; Diamanti played inspired football and provided an assist for Marco Di Vaio's opening goal and then netted a 73rd-minute goal to earn his side a 2–2 draw.

Diamanti scored the winning goal of a 3–1 away victory over Lazio on 11 March 2012 with a 30-yard strike over out-of-position goalkeeper Federico Marchetti. On 12 April, Diamanti scored an incredible free-kick against Cagliari to move his side up to 40 points and six points clear of the relegation zone.

On 16 September 2012, Diamanti scored in between strikes from Alberto Gilardino to help Bologna to a 3–2 comeback victory over Roma at the Stadio Olimpico. Diamanti put the finishing touches on a comfortable 3–0 defeat of Palermo on 18 November, netting from the penalty spot in the 48th minute.

On 2 December, Diamanti netted from a free-kick as Bologna earned a hard-fought 2–1 victory over Atalanta, courtesy of a second-half goal from teammate Manolo Gabbiadini. Two weeks later, on 16 December, Diamanti proved instrumental in Bologna's surprise 3–2 defeat of high-flying Napoli, providing the free-kick from which Daniele Portanova headed in a minute from time to secure the victory.

During the 2012–13 Serie A season, Diamanti was the most fouled player in Serie A, having been fouled 147 times.

Guangzhou Evergrande
On 7 February 2014, Bologna and Guangzhou Evergrande officially announced an agreement over transferring Diamanti to Guangzhou Evergrande with a transfer fee of €6.9 million. He made his debut appearance for Guangzhou in a 4–2 win over Melbourne Victory on 26 February 2014 in the first group match of the 2014 Asian Champions League. He scored twice to change the course of the match after Guangzhou lagged 2–0 in the first half. He made his CSL debut at the CSL's opening match at Tianhe Stadium on 8 March 2014; he did not score a goal, and was substituted off the pitch in the 67th minute.

Fiorentina (loan)
On 10 January 2015, Diamanti moved to Fiorentina on loan from Guangzhou Evergrande. He scored his first goal for the club on 8 February in a 3–2 win over Atalanta.

Watford (loan)
On 17 August 2015, Diamanti signed for English Premier League club Watford, on loan from Guangzhou Evergrande, subject to international clearance.

Atalanta (loan)
On 13 January 2016, Diamanti signed a season-long loan with Atalanta. He scored his first goal for the club on 20 March in a 2–0 win over former club Bologna.

Palermo
On 29 August 2016, free agent Diamanti joined Palermo on a two-year deal. After the club's relegation at the end of the 2016–17 Serie A season, however, he cancelled his contract with the club on 31 August 2017.

Western United

On 24 July 2019, Diamanti joined new A-League club Western United on a one-year marquee deal. Diamanti was also named as the club's inaugural captain ahead of the 2019–20 A-League season. At the end of the season he won the Johnny Warren Medal as the best player of the year.

International career

Diamanti made his debut with the Italy national team on 17 November 2010, for manager Cesare Prandelli, in a friendly match against Romania. He played only the first half of his debut game before being substituted. In May 2012, he was named in the provisional, 32-man Italian squad for UEFA Euro 2012 and came on as a substitute in the final group match against the Republic of Ireland on 18 June 2012, setting up Mario Balotelli's goal from a corner as Italy won the match 2–0 to advance to the quarter-finals. In the quarter-final against England on 24 June 2012, Diamanti came on in the second half for Antonio Cassano and scored the winning penalty to give Italy a 4–2 penalty shoot-out win.

Diamanti was selected for Italy's squad at the 2013 FIFA Confederations Cup in Brazil. He scored one goal at the tournament, from a free kick in the bronze medal game against Uruguay, his first international goal; he was also involved in Davide Astori's opening goal, as the latter scored off the rebound after Diamanti's free kick had hit the crossbar. Italy went on to win the match 3–2 on penalties following a 2–2 deadlock after extra time.

Style of play
Nicknamed "Alino", Diamanti is a dynamic, creative and technically gifted left-footed playmaker, who usually plays as an attacking midfielder; he has also been deployed as a winger or as a supporting striker on occasion, due to his ability to both create chances for teammates, and score goals with his accurate striking ability from outside the area, despite his lack of pace. He is predominantly known for his vision, passing, crossing, control, and dribbling ability, as well as his accuracy from penalties; he is also a set-piece specialist, known for his delivery from dead ball situations, as well as his precise curling direct free kicks, and has scored directly from corner kicks throughout his career. In addition to his flair and playing ability, he is also known for his charismatic personality, tenacity, and leadership on the pitch; moreover, he is a player who wins a lot of fouls for his team.

Personal life
Diamanti's wife, Silvia Hsieh, is Taiwanese. They married on 6 July 2008. On 18 December 2008, Silvia gave birth to their daughter, Aileen. On 17 July 2010, Silvia gave birth to a second girl, named Olivia. On 8 March 2013, the couple's third child, a boy named Taddeo, was born.

Career statistics
Club

 International 

Scores and results list Italy's goal tally first, score column indicates score after each Diamanti goal.

HonoursFiorentina Serie C2: 2002–03Livorno Serie B Play-offs: 2008–09Guangzhou Evergrande Chinese Super League: 2014Italy UEFA European Championship runner-up: 2012
 FIFA Confederations Cup third place: 2013Individual'
PFA A-League Team of the Season: 2019–20
Johnny Warren Medal: 2020

References

External links
 
 

1983 births
Living people
People from Prato
Sportspeople from the Province of Prato
Italian footballers
Association football forwards
Empoli F.C. players
ACF Fiorentina players
U.C. AlbinoLeffe players
A.C. Prato players
U.S. Livorno 1915 players
West Ham United F.C. players
Watford F.C. players
Brescia Calcio players
Bologna F.C. 1909 players
Atalanta B.C. players
Guangzhou F.C. players
Palermo F.C. players
A.C. Perugia Calcio players
Western United FC players
Serie A players
Serie B players
Serie C players
Serie D players
Premier League players
Chinese Super League players
A-League Men players
Marquee players (A-League Men)
Italy international footballers
UEFA Euro 2012 players
2013 FIFA Confederations Cup players
Italian expatriate footballers
Italian expatriate sportspeople in England
Italian expatriate sportspeople in China
Italian expatriate sportspeople in Australia
Expatriate footballers in England
Expatriate footballers in China
Expatriate soccer players in Australia
Footballers from Tuscany